Šime Luketin (born 7 September 1953 in Split, Yugoslavia) is a Croatian retired football player.

Club career
In his career, he played for Hajduk Split and FC Sochaux-Montbéliard.

Post-playing career
Luketin was chairman of the board of two different banks, which both fell into liquidation.

References

External links
 

1953 births
Living people
Footballers from Split, Croatia
Association football defenders
Yugoslav footballers
HNK Hajduk Split players
FC Sochaux-Montbéliard players
Yugoslav First League players
Ligue 1 players
Yugoslav expatriate footballers
Expatriate footballers in France
Yugoslav expatriate sportspeople in France